Pyrimidine is an aromatic, heterocyclic, organic compound similar to pyridine. One of the three diazines (six-membered heterocyclics with two nitrogen atoms in the ring), it has nitrogen atoms at positions 1 and 3 in the ring. The other diazines are pyrazine (nitrogen atoms at the 1 and 4 positions) and pyridazine (nitrogen atoms at the 1 and 2 positions). 

In nucleic acids, three types of nucleobases are pyrimidine derivatives: cytosine (C), thymine (T), and uracil (U).

Occurrence and history

The pyrimidine ring system has wide occurrence in nature
as substituted and ring fused compounds and derivatives, including the nucleotides cytosine, thymine and uracil, thiamine (vitamin B1) and alloxan. It is also found in many synthetic compounds such as barbiturates and the HIV drug, zidovudine. Although pyrimidine derivatives such as alloxan were known in the early 19th century, a laboratory synthesis of a pyrimidine was not carried out until 1879, when Grimaux reported the preparation of barbituric acid from urea and malonic acid in the presence of phosphorus oxychloride.
The systematic study of pyrimidines began in 1884 with Pinner,
who synthesized derivatives by condensing ethyl acetoacetate with amidines. Pinner first proposed the name “pyrimidin” in 1885. The parent compound was first prepared by Gabriel and Colman in 1900,

by conversion of barbituric acid to 2,4,6-trichloropyrimidine followed by reduction using zinc dust in hot water.

Nomenclature
The nomenclature of pyrimidines is straightforward. However, like other heterocyclics, tautomeric hydroxyl groups yield complications since they exist primarily in the cyclic amide form. For example, 2-hydroxypyrimidine is more properly named 2-pyrimidone. A partial list of trivial names of various pyrimidines exists.

Physical properties
Physical properties are shown in the data box. A more extensive discussion, including spectra, can be found in Brown et al.

Chemical properties 
Per the classification by Albert six-membered heterocycles can be described as π-deficient. Substitution by electronegative groups or additional nitrogen atoms in the ring significantly increase the π-deficiency. These effects also decrease the basicity.

Like pyridines, in pyrimidines the π-electron density is decreased to an even greater extent. Therefore, electrophilic aromatic substitution is more difficult while nucleophilic aromatic substitution is facilitated. An example of the last reaction type is the displacement of the amino group in 2-aminopyrimidine by chlorine and its reverse.

Electron lone pair availability (basicity) is decreased compared to pyridine. Compared to pyridine, N-alkylation and N-oxidation are more difficult. The pKa value for protonated pyrimidine is 1.23 compared to 5.30 for pyridine. Protonation and other electrophilic additions will occur at only one nitrogen due to further deactivation by the second nitrogen. The 2-, 4-, and 6- positions on the pyrimidine ring are electron deficient analogous to those in pyridine and nitro- and dinitrobenzene. The 5-position is less electron deficient and substituents there are quite stable. However, electrophilic substitution is relatively facile at the 5-position, including nitration and halogenation.

Reduction in resonance stabilization of pyrimidines may lead to addition and ring cleavage reactions rather than substitutions. One such manifestation is observed in the Dimroth rearrangement.

Pyrimidine is also found in meteorites, but scientists still do not know its origin. Pyrimidine also photolytically decomposes into uracil under ultraviolet light.

Synthesis 
As is often the case with parent heterocyclic ring systems, the synthesis of pyrimidine is not that common and is usually performed by removing functional groups from derivatives. Primary syntheses in quantity involving formamide have been reported.

As a class, pyrimidines are typically synthesized by the principal synthesis involving cyclization of β-dicarbonyl compounds with N–C–N compounds. Reaction of the former with amidines to give 2-substituted pyrimidines, with urea to give 2-pyrimidinones, and guanidines to give 2-aminopyrimidines are typical.

Pyrimidines can be prepared via the Biginelli reaction and other multicomponent reactions. Many other methods rely on condensation of carbonyls with diamines for instance the synthesis of 2-thio-6-methyluracil from thiourea and ethyl acetoacetate or the synthesis of 4-methylpyrimidine with 4,4-dimethoxy-2-butanone and formamide.

A novel method is by reaction of N-vinyl and N-aryl amides with carbonitriles under electrophilic activation of the amide with 2-chloro-pyridine and trifluoromethanesulfonic anhydride:

Reactions
Because of the decreased basicity compared to pyridine, electrophilic substitution of pyrimidine is less facile. Protonation or alkylation typically takes place at only one of the ring nitrogen atoms. Mono-N-oxidation occurs by reaction with peracids.

Electrophilic C-substitution of pyrimidine occurs at the 5-position, the least electron-deficient. Nitration, nitrosation, azo coupling, halogenation, sulfonation, formylation, hydroxymethylation, and aminomethylation have been observed with substituted pyrimidines.

Nucleophilic C-substitution should be facilitated at the 2-, 4-, and 6-positions but there are only a few examples. Amination and hydroxylation have been observed for substituted pyrimidines. Reactions with Grignard or alkyllithium reagents yield 4-alkyl- or 4-aryl pyrimidine after aromatization.

Free radical attack has been observed for pyrimidine and photochemical reactions have been observed for substituted pyrimidines. Pyrimidine can be hydrogenated to give tetrahydropyrimidine.

Derivatives

Nucleotides 

Three nucleobases found in nucleic acids, cytosine (C), thymine (T), and uracil (U), are pyrimidine derivatives:
{|
|-
|  ||  || 
|-
|  ||  || 
|}

In DNA and RNA, these bases form hydrogen bonds with their complementary purines. Thus, in DNA, the purines adenine (A) and guanine (G) pair up with the pyrimidines thymine (T) and cytosine (C), respectively.

In RNA, the complement of adenine (A) is uracil (U) instead of thymine (T), so the pairs that form are adenine:uracil and guanine:cytosine.

Very rarely, thymine can appear in RNA, or uracil in DNA, but when the other three major pyrimidine bases are represented, some minor pyrimidine bases can also occur in nucleic acids. These minor pyrimidines are usually methylated versions of major ones and are postulated to have regulatory functions.

These hydrogen bonding modes are for classical Watson–Crick base pairing. Other hydrogen bonding modes ("wobble pairings") are available in both DNA and RNA, although the additional 2′-hydroxyl group of RNA expands the configurations, through which RNA can form hydrogen bonds.

Theoretical aspects
In March 2015, NASA Ames scientists reported that, for the first time, complex DNA and RNA organic compounds of life, including uracil, cytosine and thymine, have been formed in the laboratory under outer space conditions, using starting chemicals, such as pyrimidine, found in meteorites. Pyrimidine, like polycyclic aromatic hydrocarbons (PAHs), the most carbon-rich chemical found in the universe, may have been formed in red giants or in interstellar dust and gas clouds.

Prebiotic synthesis of pyrimidine nucleotides
In order to understand how life arose, knowledge is required of the chemical pathways that permit formation of the key building blocks of life under plausible prebiotic conditions.  The RNA world hypothesis holds that in the primordial soup there existed free-floating ribonucleotides, the fundamental molecules that combine in series to form RNA.  Complex molecules such as RNA must have emerged from relatively small molecules whose reactivity was governed by physico-chemical processes.  RNA is composed of pyrimidine and purine  nucleotides, both of which are necessary for reliable information transfer, and thus natural selection and Darwinian evolution.  Becker et al. showed how pyrimidine nucleosides can be synthesized from small molecules and ribose, driven solely by wet-dry cycles. Purine nucleosides can be synthesized by a similar pathway.  5’-mono-and diphosphates also form selectively from phosphate-containing minerals, allowing concurrent formation of polyribonucleotides with both the pyrimidine and purine bases.  Thus a reaction network towards the pyrimidine and purine RNA building blocks can be established starting from simple atmospheric or volcanic molecules.

See also 

 ANRORC mechanism
 Purine
 Pyrimidine metabolism
 Simple aromatic rings
 Transition
 Transversion

References 

Biomolecules
 
Aromatic bases
Simple aromatic rings